Amiran Kardanov (born 19 August 1976) is a Russian and Greek Freestyle wrestler. He won a bronze medal at the 2000 Summer Olympics, and also competed at the 1996 Summer Olympics and 2004 Summer Olympics, coming in 4th place in the latter. Kardanov won four medals at the European Wrestling Championships.

References

External links
 

1976 births
Living people
People from Irafsky District
Greek male sport wrestlers
Olympic wrestlers of Greece
Wrestlers at the 1996 Summer Olympics
Wrestlers at the 2000 Summer Olympics
Wrestlers at the 2004 Summer Olympics
Olympic bronze medalists for Greece
Olympic medalists in wrestling
Medalists at the 2000 Summer Olympics
Naturalized citizens of Greece
Greek people of Ossetian descent
Mediterranean Games gold medalists for Greece
Mediterranean Games medalists in wrestling
Competitors at the 2001 Mediterranean Games
European Wrestling Championships medalists